Henrik Larsen (born 8 September 1997) is a Norwegian sport shooter, born in Fredrikstad. He represented Norway at the 2020 Summer Olympics in Tokyo 2021, competing in men's 10 m air rifle and in 50 metre rifle three positions.

Larsen enrolled at the University of Kentucky (UK) in 2017, but only spent the 2017–18 school year there. During his year at UK, he competed for the school's rifle team, leading the Wildcats to an NCAA team title, winning the individual NCAA title in air rifle, and being named a first-team All-American in all three possible disciplines (air rifle, smallbore, aggregate).

References

External links
 
 
 

 

1997 births
Living people
Kentucky Wildcats rifle shooters
People from Fredrikstad
Norwegian male sport shooters
Shooters at the 2020 Summer Olympics
Olympic shooters of Norway
European Games competitors for Norway
Shooters at the 2019 European Games
21st-century Norwegian people